Tomasz Moskała (born April 5, 1977 in Wadowice) is a Polish footballer (striker) who currently plays for Puszcza Niepołomice.

Career
In February 2011, he joined Puszcza Niepołomice. He also played once for Poland national football team.

References

External links
 
 

1977 births
Living people
Polish footballers
Poland international footballers
GKS Katowice players
Ruch Chorzów players
Dyskobolia Grodzisk Wielkopolski players
MKS Cracovia (football) players
Ekstraklasa players
People from Wadowice County
Sportspeople from Lesser Poland Voivodeship
Association football forwards